The 2017–18 CEV Challenge Cup was the 38th edition of the CEV Challenge Cup tournament, the former CEV Cup.

Participating teams

Qualification phase

2nd round
1st leg 21–23 November 2017
2nd leg 28–30 November 2017

|}

Main phase

16th finals
1st leg 5–7 December 2017
2nd leg 19–21 December 2017

|}

8th finals
1st leg 16–18 January 2018
2nd leg 30 January – 1 February 2018

|}

4th finals
1st leg 13–15 February 2018
2nd leg 27 February – 1 March 2018

|}

Final phase

Semi finals

|}

First leg

|}

Second leg

|}

Final

First leg

|}

Second leg

|}

Final standing

References

External links
 Official site

CEV Challenge Cup
2017 in men's volleyball
2018 in men's volleyball